Aquantia Corporation was a manufacturer of high-speed transceivers. In 2004, Aquantia Corporation was founded and first made products for Data Center connectivity, and in 2012 developed the world's first integrated 10GBASE-T MAC/PHY for servers. In 2014, Aquantia introduced a new Ethernet technology into the Enterprise Infrastructure market and was joined by Cisco and others in co-founding the NBASE-T Alliance. Their Multi-Gig technology served as the baseline for the 802.3bz standard that was ratified by the IEEE in September 2016. This standard is now the basis for all new Multi-Gig implementations on Cat 5e and Cat 6 cabling in the Enterprise, SMB and SoHo environments.

In 2016 Aquantia introduced the first 100G technology, QuantumStream.

It won Company of the Year at the 2014 annual Creativity in Electronics awards, and was ranked by Deloitte Fast 500 as the fastest-growing semiconductor company in North America in 2014, 2015 and 2016. In 2016, Aquantia was named a finalist in UBM Tech’s EE Times and EDN Annual Creativity in Electronics (ACE) Awards for “Company of the Year".

The company was acquired by Marvell Technology Group on September 19, 2019. The Aquantia brand was since phased out and replaced with Marvell brand. Aquantia's website was, for short time, redirecting to Marvell's website, but then it was shut down completely.

Acquisitions
Aquantia acquired the 10GBASE-T assets of PLX Technology in September 2012. PLX had picked them up in September 2010 from Teranetics.

References

External links 
  (archived)

Semiconductor companies of the United States
Companies formerly listed on the New York Stock Exchange
2004 establishments in California
Companies based in Milpitas, California
2017 initial public offerings
2019 mergers and acquisitions
2019 disestablishments in California